Gulf American Land Corporation (GALC) was a land development company in Florida founded by brothers Leonard and Jack Rosen. During the late 1950s and 1960s, GALC was the largest land sales company in the United States. The company is noted for its role in the development of Cape Coral, Florida, and pioneering the sales method of instalment land purchases.

In the late 1960s, GALC sold  of swampland, dubbed Golden Gate Estates, to about 40,000 buyers. Many buyers bought plots that were still underwater. They paid for them in monthly installments and acquired ownership of their properties when payments were complete. The fill resulting from digging flood control canals was used to raise the land level to comply with minimum building elevation legal requirements. The Florida Department of Business Regulation adopted real estate development reforms in the 1970s because of such abuses.

In 1969, GALC (which by then had shortened its name from Gulf American Land Corp to Gulf American Corp) and its sister companies were taken over by General Acceptance Corp.

Beginning
Leonard and Jack Rosen began their business career as street vendors in Baltimore. They used the earnings of their original business and high interest loans advanced by Chicago financier, Jay Pritzker to set up a real estate development company selling yet-to-be developed plots of land in the northwest Florida Everglades to prospective homeowners from the Northeast and Midwest. Leonard would be convinced by Milt Mendelsohn to create these developments in Florida.

Gulf American
The Rosen's land purchase in November 1957 was followed by the start of construction in January 1958 and the first completed units being occupied by residents soon after. The same year, the Rosen's also founded Gulf American Land Corporation (GALC).

GALC organised day trips for prospective customers by using their own airline, Gulf American Airlines, which operated a shuttle service linking Miami to Fort Myers Page Field using a fleet of five Douglas DC-3s. Page Field was the closest airport to GALC's Cape Coral residential development (which prospective customers accessed by complimentary bus transfers from the airport). From 1958, GALC also began contracting US supplemental carrier Modern Air to fly prospective customers from the Northeast and Midwest into Miami, where they transferred between Modern Air's Curtiss C-46s and Gulf American Airlines' DC-3s en route to and from Fort Myers. These flights formed part of Gulf American Land's free sales pitch and were free for prospective customers, who were also served a free meal on board the aircraft on each leg of their journey. GALC's business eventually accounted for 25% of Modern Air's total business.

To protect themselves against buyers attempting to wriggle out of the contractual terms of their purchase agreements with GALC following a sudden change of mind and potential defaulters, plots were oversold. Gulf American would start getting complaints against their sales practices in the early 1960s. Governor Haydon Burns respond to this criticism by placing Leonard Rosen to Florida's Installment Land Sales Board which was created to investigate these complaints.

On 29 June 1966, Modern Air became a wholly owned subsidiary of GALC following the purchase of the airline's entire stock from its previous owner, John Becker, for $807,500 in May/June 1966. GALC's acquisition of Modern Air resulted in consolidation of the airline's operations at Miami International Airport and its merger with Gulf American Airlines.

In December 1966, GALC's stockholder meeting resolved to drop "Land" from its name to shorten it to Gulf American Corporation (GAC) to reflect its increasing diversification and approved an employee stock purchase plan worth $600,000. This saw GAC and Modern Air become wholly owned subsidiaries of newly created holding company GAC Corporation, with all real estate related business activities being absorbed into newly formed GAC Corp subsidiary GAC Properties.

In 1967, the State of Florida ordered GAC Properties to suspend all sales for 30 days, following allegations of fraudulent sales practices.

According to Leonard Rosen, the Rosen's total accumulated net profit from property-related activities amounted to $100 million, while GAC's stock was valued at $150 million by the end of the 1960s.

Sale of Gulf American to General Acceptance
In 1969, the Rosen's sold GAC to General Acceptance Corporation for more than $200 million, with Jack and Leonard Rosen each receiving a cash payment of $100,000, in addition to approximately $63 million worth of General Acceptance stock and dividend payments of $544,000 each year for the first three years and $1.64 million each year thereafter.

General Acceptance Corp's origins go back to August 1933, when it was formed in Allentown, Pennsylvania. Initially focusing on car finance, in the 1950s, General Acceptance branched out into insurance, consumer and real estate finance, followed by expansion into truck trailer and construction equipment manufacturing in the 1960s.

From May 1969, GAC Properties began organising day trips for prospective customers to view its new Rio Rico property development near Nogales in conjunction with its Modern Air airline, flying them into Tucson, Arizona.

Also in 1969, Jack Rosen died at the age of 50 in Miami, as a result of a heart attack.

GAC's dwindling property business in the wake of the recession caused by the 1973 oil crisis resulted in cancellation of subsidiary Modern Air's contract to fly in prospective land buyers from the Northeast and Midwest to inspect its property developments in various locations in Florida and Arizona at the end of 1973. Rising interest rates increased GAC's borrowing costs and made it increasingly difficult to refinance the company's public debt. In addition, GAC's poor environmental record and controversial sales techniques attracted growing negative attention among the authorities, consumer and environmental groups as well as the general public. These factors combined to force a reduction in residential developments and closure or disposal of non-core activities, including GAC's computer leasing business and Modern Air. As a result, GAC entered Chapter 11 bankruptcy protection in 1975.

GAC emerged from bankruptcy protection in September 1980 as a wholly owned subsidiary of newly created holding company Avatar Holdings, Inc. Under its new guise, the real estate business still accounted for 70% of its total revenues, with the remainder being accounted for by water and wastewater utility services.

In 1987, Leonard Rosen died of natural causes in Las Vegas at the age of 72.

GAC's current business activities include providing US consumers with
 hire purchase car finance plans purchased from car dealerships
 extended warranty contracts
 credit, life and disability insurance in connection with contracts purchased from third parties.

See also 

 General Development Corporation

Notes and citations
Notes

Citations

Cape Coral, Florida
Companies based in Florida